The CSLU Toolkit is a software library comprising a comprehensive suite of tools that enable exploration, learning, and research into speech and human-computer interaction. 
It is developed by the Center for Spoken Language Understanding at the OGI School of Science and Engineering, a school of the Oregon Health & Science University.

The tools include: 
 Audio 
 Display
 Speech recognition
 Speech generation
 Animated faces

See also
 List of speech recognition software

External links 
 toolkit : about, CSLU Toolkit

Computer libraries